Central Congregational Church is a United Church of Christ congregation established in 1852 in Providence, Rhode Island.
The current church building at 296 Angell Street was built in 1893, designed by New York architectural firm Carrère and Hastings. It is part of the Stimson Avenue Historic District. 
The church has a long tradition of social and community work in the Providence area, the United States and around the world.

History
The church’s history traces back to the 1830s, when Providence Congregationalists sought a new place of worship on the east side of the river. They received a charter for the Benefit Street Congregational Society in 1836 but faced difficulties obtaining land. The organization received a new charter in 1850, and changed its name to the Central Congregational Society in 1851.
Among the early leaders in the church were John Kingsbury, William J. King, George L. Claflin, William J. Cross, and Nancy Marsh.
The church called the Rev. Leonard Swain from Nashua, New Hampshire to be its minister in 1852. Rev. Swain insisted that the church pay off all its debts before he accepted his call. Leonard Swain died at age 48 in 1869, while serving as minister.

For the church’s 50th anniversary in 1902, longtime deacon Moses E. Torrey wrote of the founding of the church and the pastorate of Leonard Swain.  After Torrey’s address, the Rev. George Harris, the Rev. Charles W. Huntington, and the Rev. Edward C. Moore each wrote of their successive pastorates. During Moore's tenure, the church made the transition from its original Benefit Street building to a new edifice on Angell Street and Diman Place. Rev. Moore resigned to become Parkman Professor of Theology at Harvard University in 1902, the year of the church’s 50th anniversary. At this time, Gregory D. Walcott was the Assistant Minister, and the diaconate consisted of Moses E. Torrey, Edwin Barrows, Thomas B. Stockwell, John W. Danielson, Frederic H. Fuller, Arthur W. Fairchild, Frederick H. Jackson, and James C. Kimball. 

The church supported the founding of the first Cape Verdean Protestant church in America, now called Sheldon Street Church.

Architecture

Original Building
The original building of Central Congregational Church is a brownstone Romanesque structure at 226 Benefit Street, designed by Thomas Tefft and built from 1853-1856.
The site was determined by a building committee of James Y. Smith, John Kingsbury, and William Foster, with a groundbreaking in 1851.
The Congregation outgrew this building in the College Hill Historic District, and moved to its current location in the 1890s. The old building is now part of the Rhode Island School of Design, and is known as Memorial Hall.

Current Building
A committee of Francis W. Carpenter, John W. Danielson, Frederic Fuller, Frederick C. Sayles, and Frederic Talbot recommended the move to the corner of Angell Street and Diman Place. 
For the new building, architect Thomas Hastings and minister Edward C. Moore wanted to use the Renaissance style for its historical associations. The cornerstone was laid in July 1891, and the building was dedicated in November 1893. Franklin J. Sawtelle served as supervising and constructing architect. 

The dome and vaulting of the current structure is of tiles by Rafael Guastavino, it is the first dome that he constructed in the U.S. The dome and vaulting originally featured exposed red Guastavino tile on its exterior, but this was later covered with copper. The original towers were damaged in storms, and were replaced in 1958.

The interior features oak woodwork. Some work was completed by Pottier & Stymus.

The primary interior decoration is focused on the pulpit and the chancel.

Chancel
Francis W. Carpenter funded the chancel apse decoration, which was executed by Herman T. Schladermundt of New York. The First Century of Central Congregational Church (1952) describes the painted scenes:

The communion table was "purchased from the legacy of Miss Nancy Marsh." The Gorham bronze lectern was a gift of the Young People's Societies.

Stained Glass
The round stained-glass windows under the dome were the work of the J&R Lamb Studios and the Decorative Stained Glass Company, and were installed when the church was built.  

The larger stained-glass windows were designed by Jacob Holzer with work by the Duffner and Kimberly Company, and were installed over several years in the early 20th century. They depict the creation of the earth in the east and the heavenly city in the west, and are described as 'unsurpassed in the state.' The First Century of Central Congregational Church (1952) provides a description of the window plan: 

An additional backlit stained-glass pendant was added at the corner of the side aisle and the East Transept in 1950. It was given by former organist, Helen Hogan Coome, who with church support ministered to Londoners suffering after The Blitz. The pendant is a depiction of the church, designed by an artist that Coome helped.
It is described in the 1952 Anniversary Calendar:

Organ
The current Aeolian-Skinner organ was installed in 1965 and dedicated to the Reverend Arthur Howe Bradford. It replaced an organ built by Austin Organs in 1917, which replaced a Farrand & Votey Organ Company instrument. The installation included a new organ screen and the extension of the choir loft. It contains four divisions, 58 ranks and a total of 3,456 pipes, and was restored in 2009.

Chapel Hall
Before the construction of the present sanctuary, the church built Memorial Chapel, now known as Chapel Hall. The Chapel was given to the church by Mr. and Mrs. John W. Danielson and Miss Amelia Lockwood, in memory of Amos DeForest Lockwood and Amelia Fuller Lockwood. It was first used on Easter Sunday, April 17, 1892.

Education Wing
Between 1928 and 1932, the church added a large Church School building, and renovated and expanded other facilities, including the Memorial Chapel. The architects for these additions were Jackson, Robertson & Adams. The Education Wing contains a large basement recreation room, known as the Makepeace Room.

Wilson Chapel
In 1964, the side-facing pews in the West Transept were re-arranged to face forward, creating the Wilson Chapel. It is named in honor of the Rev. William Croft Wilson, a young associate minister of the church who died very suddenly.

Senior Ministers
To date, there have been ten Senior Ministers of Central Congregational Church:
Leonard Swain, D.D. 1852-1869
George Harris Jr., D.D. 1872-1883
Charles W. Huntington, D.D. 1884-1888
Edward C. Moore, D.D. 1889-1902
Edward F. Sanderson, B.D. 1903-1908
Gaius Glenn Atkins, D.D. 1910-1917
Arthur H. Bradford, D.D. 1918-1952
Lawrence L. Durgin, D.D. 1952-1961
Raymond E. Gibson, Ph.D. 1961-1988
Rebecca L. Spencer, M.Div. 1988-

Gallery

See also
Hamilton House, a non-profit next door at 276 Angell Street, also designed by Carrere and Hastings

References

External links
Central Congregational Church official website
Finery on Easter, when and where?
David Brussat: The rise and fall of the Guastavino tile
SAH Archipedia: Central Congregational Church 
The Central Congregational Church, Providence

Churches in Providence, Rhode Island
United Church of Christ churches in Rhode Island
Carrère and Hastings buildings
Churches completed in 1893
Church buildings with domes